Genevieve Gillette (May 19, 1898 – 1986) was an early conservationist in Michigan.

Life
She was born in Lansing on May 19, 1898 and attended Michigan Agricultural College, Michigan State University. She was the only woman to graduate in the college’s first landscape architecture class in 1920. Gillette moved to Chicago where she worked in the office of garden designer, Jens Jensen.

During the early 1920s, she developed a close friendship with P. J. Hoffmaster, Superintendent of State Parks (1922–1934) and later Director of the Department of Conservation. Hoffmaster enlisted the aid of Gillette to scout the state for areas of land having state park potential, an assignment which she made her life’s work.

Beginning in 1924, she helped locate and raise public support and funding for parks at Ludington, Hartwick Pines, Wilderness, and Porcupine Mountains. Other parks included Sleeping Bear Dunes National Lakeshore, Pictured Rocks National Lakeshore, the Huron-Clinton Metroparks system, and what was to become the P. J. Hoffmaster State Park in the sand dunes area of Lake Michigan between Grand Haven and Muskegon.

To assist in garnering public support for her projects, she founded and was president of the Michigan Parks Association. This group was instrumental in promoting a large state bond issue for parks and recreation in 1969. Gillette herself labored on the proposed bond issue for a period of ten years. She was also mainly responsible for securing federal funding for the Michigan state parks system in the mid-sixties, arguing that substantial numbers of park users were from out-of-state and that these users should share in the cost of upkeep of the state system.

During this period she was also appointed by President Johnson to serve on the President’s Advisory Committee on Recreation and Natural Beauty. She also served on many other important boards and committees over the years. As late as 1981 she was also serving on the Wilderness and Natural Areas Advisory Board of Michigan by appointment of the Governor.

The Gillette Nature Center at the Hoffmaster State Park, which was dedicated in 1976, stands as a tribute to this woman whose determination helped to preserve the state’s natural heritage for future generations to enjoy. It might justly be said of Genevieve Gillette: “If you are seeking for her monument, look about you.”

External links 
 Michigan Women's Hall of Fame
 Michigan Walk of Fame, List of Stars with texts of the plaques

Michigan State University alumni
American environmentalists
American women environmentalists
1898 births
1986 deaths
20th-century American women
20th-century American people